Rice table may refer to:

 Rijsttafel, a Dutch-Indonesian meal
 RICE table, a table used in chemistry